NA-163 Bahawalnagar-IV is a constituency for the National Assembly of Pakistan.

Members of Parliament

2018-2022: NA-169 Bahawalnagar-IV

Election 2002 

General elections were held on 10 Oct 2002. Muhammad Ijaz Ul Haq of PML-Q won by 55,109 votes.

Election 2008 

General elections were held on 18 Feb 2008. Muhammad Afzal Sindhu of PPP won by 83,903 votes.

Election 2013 

General elections were held on 11 May 2013. Ijaz-ul-Haq of PML-Z won by 79,306 votes and became the  member of National Assembly.

Election 2018 

General elections were held on 25 July 2018.

See also
NA-162 Bahawalnagar-III
NA-164 Bahawalpur-I

References

External links 
Election result's official website

NA-191